El-Shafei, El Shafei or ElShafei, also seen with different capitalisations, is an Egyptian surname. Notable people with this surname include:

 Abdel Aziz El-Shafei (born 1931), Egyptian swimmer
 Adli El Shafei
 Adli El Shafei II (born 1973), Egyptian tennis player
 Alaa El-Din El-Shafei (born 1950), Egyptian water polo player
 Aly El-Shafei, Egyptian engineer
 Emad El-Shafei (born 1966), Egyptian swimmer
 Hassan El Shafei (born 1982), Egyptian artist
 Hussein el-Shafei
 Ismail El Shafei (born 1947), Egyptian tennis player
 Yassin ElShafei (born 2001), Egyptian squash player

See also
 Al-Shafi'i